Orestes Ferrara y Marino (18 July 1876, Naples, Italy - 16 February 1972, Rome), known in Italy as Oreste Ferrara, was an Italian Cuban, who fought for Cuba's independence. He was also an attorney, a journalist, a writer and an entrepreneur who founded one of the best newspapers of La Habana.

Life

Ferrara was born in Napoli in 1876 and since his teens promoted the ideals of Risorgimento as an admirer of Garibaldi. At the young age of 20 he went as volunteer to Cuba in order to fight for its independence.

Ferrara spoke at rallies against Spanish oppressors for the Cuban exiles in Florida. He often wore his revolutionary garb, a uniform that had been used in Garibaldi years in Italy. After graduating as attorney in Italy, he went on to lead an expedition to Cuba and fight as a guerrilla with some of his Tampa followers.  He eventually rose to numerous positions in the Cuban Republic: Ferrara was President of the House of Representatives from April 1909 to 1914 and from April 1915 to 1917, ambassador to the USA and delegate to the UNESCO.

Ferrara during his nearly one hundred years of life was:
 a "mambi" colonel, hero of the Cuban War of Independence
 Cuban ambassador to the United States
 Cuban delegate to UNESCO
 signer of the  1940 Constitution of Cuba
 founder of the magazine La Reforma Social (1913-1926) and of El Heraldo de Cuba (1914-1926), a national newspaper which, six months after its founding would become the most widely circulated paper in Cuba with a circulation of 65,000.
 professor of the Faculty of Law in the University of La Habana.

In 1959 Ferrara, who was against the Cuban Revolution promoted by Fidel Castro, decided to go back to Italy where he died in 1972.

Literary works
Ferrara wrote many books and documents, as journalist and editor:
 La guerra europea. Causas y pretextos, Nueva York-Londres, Appleton, 1915.
 La politica internazionale dell'Italia e la presente guerra. Conferenza tenuta a bordo della Dante Alighieri il 5 agosto 1915, Portici, Stabilimento tipografico E. Della Torre, 1915?
 Lessons of the war and the peace conference by Oreste Ferrara. Authorized translation from the Spanish by Leopold Grahame, New York-London, Harper & brothers, 1919.
 Machiavel. Traduit par Francis de Miomandre, Paris, H. Champion, 1928. Ed. italiana: Machiavelli, Milano, Treves, 1930.
 El panamericanismo y la opinion europea, Paris, Le livre libre, 1930. Ed francese: L'Amérique et l'Europe. Le panaméricanisme et l'opinion europeénne. Traduction Francis de Miomandre, Paris, Le Oeuvres représentatives, 1930.
 Tentativas de intervención europea en América: 1896-1898, La Habana, Editorial Hermes, 1933.
 Le pape Borgia. Alexandre VI. Traduit par Francis de Miomandre, Paris, Librairie ancienne Honore Champion, 1939. Ed. italiana: Il papa Borgia, a cura di Alessandro Cutolo, Milano, Garzanti, 1953.
 Mis relaciones con Maximo Gomez. Apéndice memoria sobre la guerra de indipendencia por Lorenzo Despradel, seconda edizione, La Habana, Molina y Compania, 1942.
 Un pleito sucesorio: Enrique IV, Isabel de Castilla y la Beltraneja, Madrid, La Nave, 1945.
 Ciceron y Mirabeau. La moral de dos grandes oradores, Madrid, La Nave, 1949.
 El siglo XVI a la luz de los embajadores venecianos, Madrid, Graficas Orbe, 1952. Ed. italiana: Il secolo XVI visto dagli ambasciatori veneziani, traduzione di Emma Barzini, Milano, A. Martello, 1960.
 Gasparo Contarini et ses missions. Traduit de l'espagnol par Francis de Miomandre, Paris, Albin Michel, 1956.
 L'Avenement d'Isabelle la Catholique. Traduit de l'Espagnol par Francois de Miomandre, Paris, A. Michel, 1958.
 Il pensiero politico di Nitti sui trattati di pace, Estr. da: Nuova Antologia, pp 351–78, Novembre 1958.
 Philippe II. Traduit de l'espanol par Francis de Miomandre et A. D. Toledano, Paris, Albin Michel, 1961. Ed. Italiana: Filippo II, traduzione di Emma Barzini, Milano, A. Martello, 1965.

References

External links
 Una mirada sobre tres siglos: Memorias, Orestes Ferrara y Marino - autobiography (in Spanish)
 Candidates for the Executive Board, Curriculum Vitae, Dr. Orestes Ferrara Marino", UNESCO
 Orestes Ferrara - memorial site

See also
 Italian Cuban
 Juan Bautista Spotorno
 Gian Luigi Nespoli
 Roberto Gottardi

Cuban journalists
Male journalists
Cuban military personnel
Cuban politicians
Speakers of the House of Representatives of Cuba
Emigrants from Italy to Spanish Cuba
Ambassadors of Cuba to the United States
Permanent Delegates of Cuba to UNESCO
Italian newspaper founders
Italian magazine founders
1876 births
1972 deaths